William Smith (1849 – 30 October 1913) was a British Liberal Party politician who served as the Member of Parliament (MP) for North Lonsdale from 1892 to 1895.

He won the seat at the 1892 general election, but did not stand again at the 1895 general election.

He was Chairman of the Federation of Tenant Farmers' Clubs.

References

External links 

1849 births
1913 deaths
UK MPs 1892–1895
Liberal Party (UK) MPs for English constituencies